Nippotaeniidae is a family of flatworms belonging to the order Nippotaeniidea.

Genera:
 Amurotaenia Achmerov, 1941
 Nippotaenia Yamaguti, 1939

References

Platyhelminthes